Vandenberg is the first studio album by the Dutch hard rock band Vandenberg, released in 1982 on Atco Records. The album was produced by Vandenberg with British sound engineer Stuart Epps and recorded at Jimmy Page's Sol Studios in England.

The power ballad "Burning Heart" was released internationally as the single from the album. “Burning Heart” peaked at number 39 on the Billboard Hot 100. The album peaked at number 65 on the Billboard 200 album chart in 1983 and AllMusic called it "easily one of the most underrated debut metal albums of the '80s."

Vandenberg was remastered and re-released on Wounded Bird Records in 2002.

Track listing 
Music and lyrics by Adrian Vandenberg.

Side one
 "Your Love Is in Vain" - 4:15
 "Back on My Feet" - 3:55
 "Wait" - 5:11
 "Burning Heart" - 4:11

Side two
"Ready for You" - 3:57
 "Too Late" - 4:12
 "Nothing to Lose" - 3:23
 "Lost in a City" - 3:58
 "Out in the Streets" - 4:07

Personnel

Vandenberg
Bert Heerink - lead vocals
Adrian Vandenberg - guitars, keyboards, backing vocals, cover design
Dick Kemper - bass guitar, Taurus pedals and background vocals
Jos Zoomer - drums and background vocals

Production
Stuart Epps - producer, engineer
Mastering at The Townhouse, London

References

1982 debut albums
Vandenberg (band) albums
Atco Records albums